William Stephen Johnson (5 January 1886 – 5 October 1964) was an Australian rules footballer who played for Essendon and Carlton in the Victorian Football League (VFL).

Johnson was originally from Castlemaine and captained West Melbourne to their only VFA premiership in 1906. He was then signed by Essendon, with whom he played as a half back flanker in their losing 1908 VFL Grand Final team. After a few seasons in Queensland, Johnson returned to the league in 1912 and spent the year at Carlton.

References

Holmesby, Russell and Main, Jim (2007). The Encyclopedia of AFL Footballers. 7th ed. Melbourne: Bas Publishing.

1886 births
1964 deaths
Essendon Football Club players
Carlton Football Club players
Castlemaine Football Club players
West Melbourne Football Club players
Australian rules footballers from Victoria (Australia)
People from Castlemaine, Victoria